The Fiat Linea (Type 323) was a compact sedan released on 26 March 2007 at the Tofaş plant in Bursa, Turkey, by the Italian automaker Fiat as a world car in developing countries. It is based on the current Fiat Grande Punto platform. The Linea was designed by Fiat Style Centre and co-developed by Tofaş (joint venture between the Fiat Group and Koç Holding) and Fiat do Brasil. Production in Turkey ended in 2016.

History

The Fiat Linea is built on the FCA Small LWB platform. It is only  shorter than the Fiat Viaggio compact sedan from the C-segment.

At launch, in Turkey in 2007, the car was initially available with a 1.4 Fire gasoline engine and 1.3 Multijet diesel engine. The 1.4 TurboJet engine with 120 PS, and the 1.6 diesel with 105 PS were the next models to be made available. Production at the Tofaş plant is mostly aimed at the local Turkish market, whereas CBUs are shipped out for the EU market and CKD components are shipped to the Tatarstan plant of the Fiat-Sollers joint venture in Russia.

The Fiat Linea was launched in South Africa in September 2009.

In 2009, the Linea contains 65% Indian parts. Another variant of the Fiat Linea, which includes the much acclaimed 1.4L T-JET Engine providing , was released on 8 October 2010 in India.

In 2010 (2011 model) Fiat replaced the Torque engine (1.9 16v Flex) with a new 1.8 16v E.torQ, derived from the old 1.6 16v SOHC Tritec engines used in the Mini Cooper and Chrysler PT Cruiser. Fiat Powertrain Technologies changed the displacement from 1598 cc to 1747 cc and made it a flex fuel engine (ethanol/petrol). Car performance did not change significantly; using only E-Torq engines in Latin America was largely a strategic decision for Fiat.

Fiat Linea runs in a different segment and has different competition in Brazil and India. It is positioned in the upper B segment and goes against cars like the Honda City, Toyota Yaris sedan, Citroen C-Elysee, Ford Fiesta, Hyundai Accent/Verna. This positioning has been done to gain a foothold in the Indian market and to achieve the reduced price several features such as the TS and ESC (which are optional).

Car systems
Linea is equipped with the Blue&Me hands-free system, a Microsoft Windows Mobile-based system with multi-language voice recognition and speech functions. The system allows one to browse the mobile's phonebook, read SMSs aloud and display them on the MID, and controls the audio system. A USB stick with music files on it can be plugged into the built-in USB port and music can be played via Blue&Me's built-in Microsoft Windows Media Player.

In Brazil, the Linea can be equipped, optionally, with a Blue&Me Nav system; an enhanced Blue&Me system that has a GPS system integrated. This GPS system doesn't utilise a touch screen to show maps, instead it uses a regular display that gives directions by voice guidance and displays directional arrows for navigation. The destination address, as well as other instructions, can be entered by voice, just like the regular Blue&Me system, or by using the controls on the steering wheel. The Linea is the first car in Brazil that has an integrated GPS system.

Engines

Fiat Linea in India
Presently, the four different variants of Fiat Linea available are: Active, Dynamic, Emotion and Emotion Pack. A Linea Dynamic pack was also available earlier but has been discontinued since April 2010. All these variants are available with both petrol (1.4L FIRE) and diesel (1.3L MultiJet) engine option. These versions are decided on the basis of price to content ratio in these vehicles. Some Standard features of Fiat Linea include: automatic climate control, Blue&Me with steering mounted controls, speed sensitive front wipers and volume control, dual rear AC vents, and Advanced Driver information System (DIS).

Fiat Linea marked the comeback of Fiat in the Indian market and has now come up with Fiat Linea T Jet.

Fiat Linea models

In 2012 only three variants were available; Emotion, Dynamic and Active for diesel variant, Active and Dynamic for 1.4 F.I.R.E. engine, and T-Jet & T-Jet + version for Petrol.

L'Unico Club
In Brazil, Fiat aimed the Linea to compete with Japanese cars, such as Honda Civic and Toyota Corolla, the market leaders for its class. As such, Fiat launched the L'Unico Club, that offered VIP services for Linea owners, such as special exclusive lines and exclusive attendants for Linea owners, invitations for special events (concerts, theatre performances, exhibitions, etc.), collect-and-deliver service for maintenance and three years' warranty, the longest warranty for Fiat cars in Brazil.

Fiat First
In India, the Linea along with the Grande Punto are part of the special service from Fiat, namely Fiat First, launched on 15 October 2009 to provide 24×7 Roadside Assistance for punctures, common spares, accident repairs and towing. Fiat provides free 24×7 Roadside Assistance package for 50 months with 2+2 years' extended warranty to all Fiat customers. This service is exclusive to Fiat India only. The Fiat Linea competes with subcompact saloons like the Honda City, Ford Fiesta 1.6S, Hyundai Verna and the Maruti Suzuki SX4. Fiat boasts of an extensive and growing sales network in India with its partnership with TATA Motors. Tata-Fiat showrooms have on display cars from both manufacturers. The car is manufactured at Fiat's state of the art Ranjangaon facility in Pune, Maharashtra. In mid-2011 Fiat and Tata decided to diverge on the marketing front, with Fiat opting to set up exclusive showrooms for its cars—the Fiat Grande Punto 2012 and the Fiat Linea 2012—released on 3 January 2012. The showrooms will be set up in around 20 major metro cities like Chennai, Bengaluru, Mumbai and New Delhi by late 2012 or early 2013.

Global sales

See also
Fiat Grande Punto

References

External links

Fiat Linea India Official Site

Linea
Sedans
2010s cars
Cars introduced in 2007
Front-wheel-drive vehicles
Cars of Turkey
Cars of India